William N. Conrad (August 17, 1889 – December 2, 1968) was an American politician from New York.

Early life
He was born on August 17, 1889, in Middle Village, in Queens County, New York. He attended Public School No. 71, and Bushwick Evening High School. Later he became a public relations consultant.

Career 
In February 1937, he was co-opted as a member of the Board of Aldermen of New York City (59th D.), to fill the vacancy caused by the resignation of Joseph F. Mafera. At the end of the year, the Board of Aldermen was abolished, and was succeeded by the New York City Council. Conrad was a member of the City Council from 1938 to 1943.

He was a member of the New York State Senate (7th D.) in 1945 and 1946. In November 1946, he ran for re-election, but was defeated by Republican Irwin Pakula.

Conrad was again a member of the State Senate from 1949 to 1952, sitting in the 167th and 168th New York State Legislatures. In November 1952, he ran for re-election, but was defeated by Republican Carlo A. Lanzillotti.

In November 1954, Conrad ran for the New York State Assembly in the 3rd District of Queens County, but was defeated by Republican Charles T. Eckstein.

Death 
He died on December 2, 1968, in Ridgewood, Queens, New York City, of a heart attack.

Sources

1889 births
1968 deaths
People from Middle Village, Queens
Democratic Party New York (state) state senators
New York City Council members
20th-century American politicians